Craig Goess Jr. (born April 14, 1981) is an American former professional stock car racing driver. He competed for Eddie Sharp Racing for the entirety of his NASCAR and ARCA career. Most recently, he drove in the NASCAR Camping World Truck Series in 2011 in their No. 46 Toyota Tundra. Prior to that, he ran full-time in Sharp's No. 81 Toyota for two years in the ARCA Racing Series to much success. He drove ESR's No. 2 car in the NASCAR Camping World East Series (now the ARCA Menards Series East) in 2008.

Motorsports career results

NASCAR
(key) (Bold – Pole position awarded by qualifying time. Italics – Pole position earned by points standings or practice time. * – Most laps led.)

Camping World Truck Series

Camping World East Series

ARCA Racing Series
(key) (Bold – Pole position awarded by qualifying time. Italics – Pole position earned by points standings or practice time. * – Most laps led.)

References

External links
 

1981 births
Living people
NASCAR drivers
Sportspeople from Woodbury, New Jersey
Racing drivers from New Jersey
ARCA Menards Series drivers